MusicMasters was a record label based in Ocean, New Jersey.

History
MusicMasters was founded in the late 1970s by Albert Nissim and his sons Robert and Jeffrey, who owned the Musical Heritage Society, which had previously only licensed European recordings for sale via mail-order.

MusicMasters produced recordings from 1981 until 1999, which were sold by mail-order and retail by the Music Heritage Society.

Initially, MusicMasters produced classical records, but began releasing jazz in 1985, when they obtained the rights to previously unreleased Yale University Library recordings by Benny Goodman.

In 2008, arrangements were made to make MusicMasters recordings available via the Orchard, a global distributor of digital audio and video.

Awards
John Browning won a Grammy Award for Best Classical Solo Performance for a MusicMasters recording of Samuel Barber's solo piano music. Benny Carter won two individual Grammy Awards for MusicMasters recordings.

Artists
This section contains a partial list of artists who have released recordings on the MusicMasters label.

A - F
 William Albright
 Amadeus Ensemble
 Louie Bellson
 Eubie Blake
 Paul Bley
 Ruby Braff
 John Browning
 The Dave Brubeck Quartet
 Benny Carter
 Chamber Orchestra of Europe
 Chilingirian Quartet
 Richie Cole
 Continuum
 Robert Craft
 Kenny Davern
 Eddy Davis
 Eastern Rebellion
 Duke Ellington
 Vladimir Feltsman
 Eliot Fisk

G - L
 Galliard Brass Ensemble
 George Gershwin
 Benny Goodman
 Michael Habermann
 Jim Hall
 Lionel Hampton
 Frederic Hand
 Richard Harvey
 Vincent Herring
 Stephen Hough
 Freddie Hubbard
 Dick Hyman
 Milt Jackson
 Keith Jarrett
 James P. Johnson
 Lainie Kazan
 Lee Konitz
 Al Kooper
 Dennis Koster
 Hubert Laws
 Los Angeles Piano Quartet
 Peggy Lee
 The Mel Lewis Jazz Orchestra
 Eugene List

M - Z
 New York Ensemble for Early Music
 Orchestra of St. Luke's
 Paris All-Star Blues featuring Jay McShann
 Marc Puricelli
 Paula Robison
 Nadja Salerno-Sonnenberg
 Fred Schneider
 Loren Schoenberg
 Bobby Scott
 Artie Shaw
 Lonnie Smith
 Marvin Stamm
 Maria Tipo
 Stanley Turrentine
 Paul Whiteman and Maurice Peress
 Carol Wincenc
 William Wolfram
 Phil Woods
 Fabio Zanon

See also 
 List of record labels

References 

American record labels
American independent record labels